Lucian Ovidiu Burchel (born 20 March 1964) is a Romanian former footballer and manager.

International career
Lucian Burchel played two friendly games at international level for Romania against Iraq.

Honours
Minerul Lupeni
Divizia C: 1982–83
Inter Sibiu
Balkans Cup: 1990–91

References

External links

1964 births
Living people
Romanian footballers
Romania international footballers
Association football forwards
Liga I players
Liga II players
Swiss Challenge League players
CS Minerul Lupeni players
FC Sportul Studențesc București players
FC Inter Sibiu players
Nyíregyháza Spartacus FC players
FC Monthey players
Yverdon-Sport FC players
Romanian expatriate footballers
Expatriate footballers in Hungary]
Romanian expatriate sportspeople in Hungary
Expatriate footballers in Switzerland
Romanian expatriate sportspeople in Switzerland
Romanian football managers
People from Lupeni